Platycythara curta is a species of sea snail, a marine gastropod mollusk in the family Mangeliidae.

Description
The length of the shell is 2.3 m, its diameter 1.5 mm.

(Original description) The small, short, solid, inflated shell has a brownish color,. The minute protoconch is smooth. It is succeeded by about three subsequent strongly sculptured whorls. The suture is distinct. The axial sculpture consists of (on the penultimate whorl about 15) narrow, sharp, similar riblets with wider interspace. This sculpture extends over the base. The spiral sculpture consists of (on the body whorl about 16) even regular similar threads with subequal interspaces which pass over but do not nodulate the ribs. The aperture is narrow. The outer lip is thickened, crenulate by the sculpture and not reflected. The anal sulcus is shallow but conspicuous. The columellar lip is smooth. The columella shows a layer of enamel with a raised edge. The siphonal canal is short, deep, but hardly differentiated.

Distribution
This marine species occurs off Pacific Panama.

References

External links
 
 

curta
Gastropods described in 1919